The men's team sprint at the 2010 Commonwealth Games took place on 8 October 2010 at the Indira Gandhi Arena.

Qualification

Finals

Final

Bronze medal match

External links
 Reports

Track cycling at the 2010 Commonwealth Games
Cycling at the Commonwealth Games – Men's team sprint